This is a list of the French SNEP Top 100 Singles & Top 75 Albums number-ones of 1998.

Number-ones by week

Singles Chart

Albums Chart

Top Ten Best Sales

This is the ten best-selling singles and albums in 1998.

Singles

Albums

References

See also
1998 in music
List of number-one hits (France)
List of artists who reached number one on the French Singles Chart

1998 in French music
1998 record charts
Lists of number-one songs in France